Ewingsdale is a small town located in the Northern Rivers Region of New South Wales.

References 

Towns in New South Wales
Northern Rivers